Alberto Rodríguez Caballero (21 August 1973) is a Spanish TV director, screenwriter and producer.

Career
He is known as the creator of Aquí no hay quien viva (2003—2006) and his successor La que se avecina (2007—). His sister is Laura Caballero, with whom he directs and produces the series.

From 2003 he adapted the dialogues in Aquí no hay quien viva. From 2009, when Telecinco adapted it version, he became the executive producer with Esther Jiménez, and Daniel Deorador and Sergio Mitjans as the screenwriters.

Since 2013 he maintains a relationship with the actress Miren Ibarguren known for representing Soraya in the Aída series and subsequently to Yolanda in which he is coming. In February 2022 he became public that he is going to be the father of his first son. The baby was born on July 17, 2022.

Personal life
In September 2012 he married actress Vanesa Romero, with whom he met in the last season of Aquí no hay quien viva. They had a crisis because in April 2013, María Adánez (his last spouse) was cast in the series. In October 2013 they broke up and Vanesa left the series during some episodes.

Awards and nominationes
In 2005, he was nominated to Premios ATV for Best Direction in Aquí no hay quien viva.

References

External links
 

Spanish television producers
Spanish cartoonists
Spanish television writers
Male television writers
Living people
1973 births
Spanish male writers
Writers from Madrid